The 1996–97 Macedonian Second Football League was the fourth season since its establishment. It began in August 1996 and ended in June 1997.

East

Participating teams

League standing

Best scorer:Sreten Denkovski/42

West

Participating teams

League standing

See also
1996–97 Macedonian Football Cup
1996–97 Macedonian First Football League

References

External links
Macedonia - List of final tables (RSSSF)
Football Federation of Macedonia 
MacedonianFootball.com 

Macedonia 2
2
Macedonian Second Football League seasons